Ctenochares is a genus of wasps belonging to the family Ichneumonidae.

The genus has cosmopolitan distribution.
???The species of this genus are found in Europe, Southern Africa and Australia.

Species:

Ctenochares amoenus 
Ctenochares bicolorus 
Ctenochares fulgens 
Ctenochares fulvidus 
Ctenochares luteus 
Ctenochares madagascariensis 
Ctenochares microcephalus 
Ctenochares pedestris 
Ctenochares rufithorax 
Ctenochares testaceus 
Ctenochares vigilator

References

Ichneumoninae
Ichneumonidae genera